Harper is a city in Keokuk County, Iowa, United States. The population was 118 at the time of the 2020 census.

Geography
Harper's longitude and latitude coordinatesin decimal form are 41.3625116, -92.0510106.

Demographics

2010 census
As of the census of 2010, there were 114 people, 49 households, and 28 families living in the city. The racial makeup of the city was 94.7% White, 0.9% Native American, 1.8% from other races, and 2.6% from two or more races. Hispanic or Latino of any race were 5.3% of the population.

There were 49 households, of which 26.5% had children under the age of 18 living with them, 44.9% were married couples living together, 6.1% had a female householder with no husband present, 6.1% had a male householder with no wife present, and 42.9% were non-families. 36.7% of all households were made up of individuals, and 18.4% had someone living alone who was 65 years of age or older. The average household size was 2.33 and the average family size was 3.07.

The median age in the city was 31.5 years. 26.3% of residents were under the age of 18; 12.3% were between the ages of 18 and 24; 27.2% were from 25 to 44; 17.5% were from 45 to 64; and 16.7% were 65 years of age or older. The gender makeup of the city was 48.2% male and 51.8% female.

2000 census
As of the census of 2000, there were 134 people, 55 households, and 40 families living in the city. The racial makeup of the city was 100.00% White.

There were 55 households, out of which 27.3% had children under the age of 18 living with them, 65.5% were married couples living together, 5.5% had a female householder with no husband present, and 25.5% were non-families. 20.0% of all households were made up of individuals, and 12.7% had someone living alone who was 65 years of age or older. The average household size was 2.44 and the average family size was 2.78.

In the city, the population was spread out, with 23.9% under the age of 18, 3.7% from 18 to 24, 28.4% from 25 to 44, 15.7% from 45 to 64, and 28.4% who were 65 years of age or older. The median age was 40 years. For every 100 females, there were 91.4 males. For every 100 females age 18 and over, there were 100.0 males.

The median income for a household in the city was $37,875, and the median income for a family was $38,594. Males had a median income of $22,083 versus $22,188 for females. The per capita income for the city was $12,620. There were 4.9% of families and 4.5% of the population living below the poverty line, including 3.9% of under eighteens and none of those over 64.

Education
Keota Community School District operates local public schools.

Arts and culture
Landmarks
The Saints Peter and Paul Roman Catholic Church in Harper is on the National Register of Historic Places.

The Saints Peter and Paul cemetery is the final resting place of eight Hammes children who all died in a tragic car-train accident in October 1956.

Notable people 

Phil Slattery, baseball player.
Dan Peiffer, NFL Football Player

References

External links

 
City-Data Comprehensive statistical data and more about Harper

Cities in Iowa
Cities in Keokuk County, Iowa